Power Hit Radio is a commercial radio station in Lithuania that plays dance music aimed at listeners aged around 15 to 35. "Power Hit Radio" started broadcasting in 2003. Transmitted through 7 transmitters throughout Lithuania. 
The "Power Hit Radio" program features a number of broadcasts, among which are: "Šok į kelnes" ("Get in the pants"), "Power hitai" ("Power hits"),"Power popietė" ("Power afternoon"), "Burbulas" ("Bubble") and the weekend's release "Power savaitgalis" ("Power Weekend"), In The Mix.

References

External links

Radio stations in Lithuania
Dance radio stations